Times New Viking is an American lo-fi indie rock band from Columbus, Ohio. The lineup consists of guitarist Jared Phillips, drummer Adam Elliott, and Beth Murphy on keyboards. Murphy and Elliott share vocal duties.

Their name, "Times New Viking," is a play on the popular typeface Times New Roman. They have released five albums: 2005's Dig Yourself, 2007's Present the Paisley Reich, and 2008's Rip It Off, which NME gave an 8/10, and 2009's Born Again Revisited. Rip it Off reached No. 17 on the Billboard Heatseekers chart. The band was formerly signed to Siltbreeze and Matador Records. In January 2011, they announced that their fifth album, Dancer Equired!, would be released in April via Merge in the US, Wichita in Europe, Pop Frenzy in Australia and Big Nothing in Japan.

Following the release of the Over & Over EP in 2012, the band went on an extended hiatus that saw the trio relocating to different corners of the US, and did not play live for four years.  In 2016, they reunited to play 4th and 4th Fest in Columbus.

Each member continues to make music and art in various mediums to this day. Murphy has released solo material as The Girl in Times New Viking, and formed the duo Married FM. Elliott joined Ohio band Connections before forming his own group, Long Odds. Phillips has released music with Counter Intuits.

Music

Times New Viking have been noted for their lo-fi aesthetic, recorded to cassette, which (along with their Ohio home) drew comparisons to Guided by Voices' early material. They were considered part of the "shitgaze" genre, alongside contemporaries such as Psychedelic Horseshit, Sic Alps and Eat Skull. Notable features of their songs include shouted vocals, distorted drums and loud, trebly guitars in addition to tape hiss and brevity. The tracks on Rip It Off were mastered to a RMS -db value of 0 (or near to) making them comparatively as loud as possible.  Their lyrics are generally sloganistic and feature pop culture references.

With 2009's Born Again Revisited, the band recorded the album to VHS and commented the recording fidelity had increased by 25%. In 2010, the group released a 7" single available on their tours opening for Guided by Voices. The single, featuring "No Room to Live", displayed cleaner production, a result of the band utilising proper recording studios for the first time – namely Musicol Recording studio and Columbus Discount Recordings. It has been reported by Merge Records that Dancer Equired! will also feature this production style.

Discography

Albums
Dig Yourself (2005)
Present the Paisley Reich (2007)
Rip It Off (January 22, 2008)
Born Again Revisited (September 22, 2009)
Dancer Equired! (April 26, 2011)

EPs
Dead New Viking EP (2005)
Stay Awake EP (2008)
Over & Over EP (2012)

Singles
 "Busy Making Love and War" (2005)
 "We Got Rocket" (2005)
 "My Head" (2007)
 "Call and Respond" (2008)
 "No Time, No Hope" (2009)
 "No Room to Live" (2011)

References

External links
Times New Viking Discography and Images at SoundUnwound
Synconation Speaks with Adam Elliott of Times New Viking

Indie rock musical groups from Ohio
Lo-fi music groups
Musical groups from Columbus, Ohio
Matador Records artists
Merge Records artists
Wichita Recordings artists
Siltbreeze Records artists